Dumara is a panchayat village in Gujarat, India. Administratively it is under Abdasa Taluka, Kutch District, Gujarat. The village of Dumara sits on the left (west) bank of the Chok River, an intermittent stream.

Geology
Dumara lies on the sandstones and conglomerates of the Kankavati Series.

Demographics
In the 2001 census, the village of Dumara had 2,523 inhabitants, with 1,333 males (52.8%) and 1,190 females (47.2%), for a gender ratio of 893 females per thousand males.

References

Villages in Kutch district